Prakash Chand Surana was an Indian jeweler, business person, philanthropist and a music connoisseur, known for his efforts to promote Hindustani music. He was the co-founder of Shruti Mandal, a music community in Jaipur and served as its president, under the aegis of which he reportedly attempted to revive Jaipur gharana tradition. Founded in 1964, the forum has hosted, over the years, such musicians as Kumar Gandharv, Ravi Shankar, Zakir Hussain, Bhimsen Joshi and Hariprasad Chaurasia. Born in 1939 in Jaipur in the Indian state of Rajasthan in a Marwari family, he inherited the family jewelry business and contributed to reviving the Kundan meenakari tradition of jewelry making. Surana, who was married to Shobha Devi and had four children- Chandra, Manju, Pracheer & Priti, died on 5 February 2015, succumbing to a cardiac arrest. The Government of India awarded him the fourth highest civilian honour of the Padma Shri, posthumously in 2016, for his contributions to arts. He was also a recipient of Sawai Bhawani Singh Award for excellence in business and industry and Dagar Gharana Award of the Maharana of Mewar Foundation.

See also 
 Jaipur gharana

References

External links 
 
Bhuramal Rajmal Surana

Recipients of the Padma Shri in arts
1939 births
Musicians from Jaipur
Hindustani musicians
Indian jewellers
Indian philanthropists
Businesspeople from Jaipur
Living people